The 1913–14 SK Rapid Wien season was the 16th season in club history.

Squad

Squad and statistics

Squad statistics

Fixtures and results

League

References

1913-14 Rapid Wien Season
Rapid